Den Hartog Peak is a small peak at the west side of the mouth of Ramsey Glacier, 3 nautical miles (6 km) southeast of Woodall Peak. It was discovered and photographed by the United States Antarctic Service on Flight C of February 29 – March 1, 1940, and surveyed by A.P. Crary in 1957–58. It was named by Crary for Stephen Den Hartog, who was glaciologist on the Victoria Land Traverse Party (1958–59), and wintered at Little America V in 1958.

References

Mountains of the Ross Dependency
Dufek Coast